Mimothestus annulicornis is a species of beetle in the family Cerambycidae. It was described by Maurice Pic in 1935. It feeds on Cinnamomum camphora.

References

Lamiini
Beetles described in 1935